Đội bóng đá Tổng cục Đường sắt (General Department of Railways Football Team) is a Vietnamese football club. They were champions in the 1980 season of the V-League, Vietnam's top-level association football league.

Achievements
V.League 1:
 Winners :  1980

Notes and references

Sport in Vietnam
Railway association football teams in Vietnam